Events in the year 1767 in Norway.

Incumbents
Monarch: Christian VII

Events
 17 July — The Trondheim Society received royal affirmation of its status as the Royal Norwegian Society of Sciences and Letters.
 The first known competition of winter sport biathlon takes place, in Norway.
 The first sections of the Hotel Refsnes Gods are erected.

Arts and literature
 3 July — Norway's oldest newspaper, still in print, Adresseavisen, is founded (first edition published this date).

Births
 4 February - Hans Hein Nysom, priest and politician (died 1831).
 26 August – Christopher Borgersen Hoen, farmer and politician (died 1845).
 9 September - Hans Henrik Rode, military officer (died 1830).

Deaths

19 September - Thomas Angell, merchant and philanthropist (born 1692).
16 December – Baltzer Fleischer, civil servant and county governor (born 1703).

See also

References